Pavel Babaylov (25 February 1919  14 October 1944) was a Soviet aviator who was posthumously awarded the title Hero of the Soviet Union for his aerial combat feats as part of the 790th Fighter Aviation Regiment. He was born in a peasant family of Russian ethnicity in Neustroyevo, Sverdlovsk Oblast on 25 February 1919. He joined the Red Army as a volunteer in January 1940 and fought in the Winter War. In 1941 he was transferred to the Soviet Air Force. He became a member of the Communist Party in 1944 and was killed in action on 14 October 1944. On 23 February 1945, he was posthumously awarded the title of Hero of the Soviet Union.

Awards
 Hero of the Soviet Union
 Order of Lenin
 Order of the Red Banner (twice)
 Order of Alexander Nevsky
 Order of the Patriotic War 1st Class
 campaign medals

References

1919 births
1944 deaths
People from Irbitsky District
Communist Party of the Soviet Union members
Soviet Air Force officers
Russian aviators
Soviet military personnel of the Winter War
Soviet World War II flying aces
Soviet military personnel killed in World War II 
Heroes of the Soviet Union
Recipients of the Order of Lenin
Recipients of the Order of the Red Banner
Recipients of the Order of Alexander Nevsky
Pilots who performed an aerial ramming